Antonio Rosati (born 26 June 1983) is an Italian former professional footballer who played as a goalkeeper.

Career

Lecce
Rosati's career began at Cisco Calcio Roma. He moved to Lecce in the 2002–03 season, making his first team debut in February 2005 in Lecce's 3–0 defeat of Chievo in Serie A. During the 2005–06 season he was sent out on loan to Sambenedettese, with which he played the 8 remaining games of Serie C1, before returning to Lecce later in the season.

Rosati was first choice for Lecce during the 2006–07 season and the successful 2007–08 Serie B campaign but only played four matches in 2008–09 when the team played in Serie A. The team was relegated back to the second division the following season and Rosati regained the first choice role after Francesco Benussi left the club. Lecce were promoted in first place.

Back in Serie A for the 2010–11 season, Rosati played all 38 league matches and was a key player as Lecce unexpectedly avoided relegation.

Napoli
Following his exceptional season with Lecce, Rosati joined Napoli for €3 million ahead of the 2011–12 season to act as back up for first choice Morgan De Sanctis.

Fiorentina
He joined Serie A club Fiorentina on a free transfer .

Perugia
On 16 July 2015, he was signed by Serie B club Perugia for an undisclosed fee.

Torino
On 12 July 2018, Rosati signed with Torino on a one-year contract.

Return to Fiorentina
On 1 February 2021, Rosati returned to Fiorentina. Rosati announced his retirement from playing on 16 August 2022.

Honours
Lecce
Serie B: 2009–10

Napoli
Coppa Italia: 2011–12

References

External links
Profile at Lega-Calcio.it

Living people
1983 births
People from Tivoli, Lazio
Footballers from Lazio
Association football goalkeepers
Italian footballers
Atletico Roma F.C. players
U.S. Lecce players
S.S.C. Napoli players
A.S. Sambenedettese players
U.S. Sassuolo Calcio players
ACF Fiorentina players
A.C. Perugia Calcio players
Torino F.C. players
Serie A players
Serie B players
Sportspeople from the Metropolitan City of Rome Capital